Lyalinsky is a rural locality (a khutor) in Sulyayevskoye Rural Settlement, Kumylzhensky District, Volgograd Oblast, Russia. The population was 7 as of 2010.

Geography 
Lyalinsky is located in forest steppe, on Khopyorsko-Buzulukskaya Plain, on the bank of the Kumylga River, 13 km north of Kumylzhenskaya (the district's administrative centre) by road. Kraptsovsky is the nearest rural locality.

References 

Rural localities in Kumylzhensky District